Francesco II d'Este (6 March 1660 – 6 September 1694) was Duke of Modena and Reggio from 1662 to 1694.

Biography
He was born in Modena to Alfonso IV d'Este, duke of Modena, and Laura Martinozzi, niece of Cardinal Mazarin. His sister, Mary of Modena,  married the future James II of England in 1673 and became queen of England in 1685. Their child, and therefore Francesco's nephew, was James, the Old Pretender who struggled to regain the throne of England during the 1715 Jacobite rebellion.

He became duke at the age of two. His mother, pious and rigorous, served as his regent until 1674, filling state offices with clerics under the advice of her Jesuit confessor Father Garimberti. When she left to accompany the princess to England, he assumed control at the age of fourteen, and was so transformed in the free and easy company of his cousin principe Cesare Ignazio d'Este, that on her return the dowager duchess withdrew from court.

Francesco's foreign policy was affected by the requirements of Louis XIV, his sister's patron after 1688, but he resisted French attempts to interfere in the duchies. A Franco Modenese alliance was proposed with Francesco and a princess of the House of Lorraine, Béatrice Hiéronyme, the eldest daughter of François Marie, Prince of Lillebonne. The marriage never materialised and instead, he married Margherita Maria Farnese.

He learned the violin as a boy and the court orchestra was revived for him when he was eleven; one of the musicians employed there was Giovanni Maria Bononcini. Francesco was a lavish and discerning patron of music, and the composer Arcangelo Corelli dedicated his Op. 3 trio sonatas (Rome, 1689) to him. His library has remained substantially complete in the Biblioteca Estense, Modena.

Bibliography
Crowther, Victor. "A Case-Study in the Power of the Purse: The Management of the Ducal 'Cappella' in Modena in the Reign of Francesco II d'Este", Journal of the Royal Musical Association, 115.2 (1990), pp. 207–219.
Cont, Alessandro. "'Sono nato principe libero, tale voglio conservarmi': Francesco II d’Este (1660-1694)", Memorie Scientifiche, Giuridiche, Letterarie, Accademia Nazionale di Scienze Lettere e Arti di Modena, ser. 8, 12 (2009), 2,  pp. 407–459.

Ancestry

External links

1660 births
1694 deaths
Hereditary Princes of Modena
Francesco 2
Francesco 2
Francesco 2
17th-century Italian nobility